Suzana Lazović (born 28 January 1992) is a retired Montenegrin handballer that played for ŽRK Budućnost Podgorica and the Montenegro women's national handball team.

She participated at the 2011 World Women's Handball Championship in Brazil.

References

1992 births
Living people
Montenegrin female handball players
Handball players at the 2012 Summer Olympics
Handball players at the 2016 Summer Olympics
Olympic handball players of Montenegro
Olympic medalists in handball
Olympic silver medalists for Montenegro
Medalists at the 2012 Summer Olympics
Sportspeople from Podgorica
Mediterranean Games medalists in handball
Mediterranean Games bronze medalists for Montenegro
Competitors at the 2009 Mediterranean Games